Tyler Wayne Harcott is a Canadian actor and television host. He has hosted TLC's Junkyard Wars as well as Miss America: Countdown to the Crown.  He has appeared in minor television roles including Honey, I Shrunk the Kids: The TV Show.  In 2012, he hosted the first season of The Bachelor Canada.

Personal life
Harcott was born in Edmonton, Alberta, but raised in Calgary, Alberta. He was married to interior designer and television host Genevieve Gorder from 2006 until 2013, with whom he has a daughter.

References

Living people
Canadian expatriates in Hong Kong
Canadian male television actors
Canadian television hosts
Male actors from Edmonton
Year of birth missing (living people)